Marvin Braun (born 11 January 1982) is a German former professional footballer  who played as a forward. He made his debut on the professional league level in the Bundesliga for VfB Stuttgart on 14 April 2002 when he came on as a substitute for Christian Tiffert in the 88th minute in a game against FC Energie Cottbus.

References

External links
  
 

1982 births
Living people
German footballers
Association football forwards
Bundesliga players
2. Bundesliga players
3. Liga players
VfB Stuttgart players
VfB Stuttgart II players
Stuttgarter Kickers players
FC Augsburg players
FC St. Pauli players
VfL Osnabrück players
Wuppertaler SV players
People from Ludwigsburg
Sportspeople from Stuttgart (region)
Footballers from Baden-Württemberg